Chateau Colline is an historic eight-unit apartment building on Wilshire Boulevard in the Westwood section of Los Angeles, California.

History and characteristics 
Designed by architect Percy Parke Lewis, Chateau Colline was built in 1935. Its leaded-glass windows, turrets, and climbing vines give it the appearance of a castle. The building also has large wood-burning fireplaces with handcrafted mantels, bakelite intercoms, vaulted ceilings and outside nooks for milk bottles. The Los Angeles Times has reported that rumor has it that "Clark Gable and Bette Davis once lived there, holding lavish parties in a second-story apartment."

Landmark status 
In 2001, the owner applied for a permit to demolish the building to build a six-story condominium project in its place. With support from the Los Angeles Conservancy, tenants organized an effort to declare the building an historic monument in order to prevent its demolition. The owner claimed the rent-controlled building had become a financial drain and needed new plumbing and electrical systems. Los Angeles City Councilman Jack Weiss supported the effort to declare the building a historic landmark, calling it a "unique, vital piece of Holmby Hills and Westwood history." The City Council eventually voted 14 to 0 to declare the building a landmark.

Chateau Colline was recognized as a Los Angeles Historic-Cultural Monument (LAHCM #703) by the city Cultural Heritage Commission in 2001 and was listed on the National Register of Historic Places in 2003.

See also
 List of Registered Historic Places in Los Angeles
 List of Los Angeles Historic-Cultural Monuments on the Westside

References

Residential buildings on the National Register of Historic Places in Los Angeles
Residential buildings completed in 1935
Apartment buildings in Los Angeles
Westwood, Los Angeles